Ha Ryun (January 22, 1348 – November 24, 1416), also spelled as Ha Yun, was a Joseon politician and Neo-Confucian scholar, educator, and writer. He served as Chief State Councillor  during the reign of King Taejong from 1408 to 1409, from 1409 to 1412 and again from 1414–1415. He was from the Jinju Ha clan (진주 하씨, 晋州 河氏).

Family 
 Father - Ha Yun-rin (하윤린, 河允潾) (? - 1394)
 Grandfather - Ha Sa-won (하시원, 河侍源) (? - 1360)
 Grandmother - Lady Jeong of the Jinju Jeong clan (증 정경부인 진주 정씨, 贈 貞敬夫人 晉州 鄭氏); daughter of Jeong Gyun (정균, 鄭均)
 Mother - Princess Consort Jinhanguk of the Jinju Kang clan (증 진한국대부인 진주 강씨, 贈 辰韓國大夫人 晋州 姜氏) (? - 1380)
 Grandfather - Kang Seung-yu (강승유, 姜承裕)
 Wife and children
 Princess Consort Jinhanguk of the Seongju Yi clan (진한국대부인 성주 이씨, 辰韓國大夫人 星州 李氏); daughter of Yi In-mi (이인미, 李仁美)
 Son - Ha Gu (하구, 河久) (1380 - 1417
 Daughter - Lady Ha of the Jinju Ha clan (진주 하씨, 晋州 河氏)
 Son-in-law - Hong Seob (홍섭, 洪涉)
 Daughter - Lady Ha of the Jinju Ha clan (진주 하씨, 晋州 河氏)
 Son-in-law - Yi Seung-gan (이승간, 李承幹) (1416 - 1417)

Works 
 Hojungjip (호정집 浩亭集)
 Samguksaryak (삼국사략 三國史略)
 Donggukyakun (동국약운 東國略韻)
 Dongguksaryak (동국사략 東國史略)
 Doinsongdojigok (도인송도지곡 都人頌禱之曲)
 Sumyungmyung (수명명 受明命; 1402)
 Sungdukgha (성덕가 聖德歌; 1402)

Popular culture 
 Portrayed by Shin Choong-sik in the 1983 MBC TV series The King of Chudong Palace.
 Portrayed by Im Hyuk in the 1996-98 KBS1 TV series Tears of the Dragon.
 Portrayed by Choi Jong-won in the 2008 KBS1 TV series The Great King, Sejong.
 Portrayed by Lee Kwang-ki in the 2014 KBS1 TV series Jeong Do-jeon.
Portrayed by Jo Hee-bong in the 2015-2016 SBS TV series Six Flying Dragons.
Portrayed by Nam Sung Jin in the 2021-2022 KBS1 TV series "The King of Tears, Lee Bang Won".

See also 
 Jeong Do-jeon
 Jeong Mong-ju
 Yi Saek
 Taejong of Joseon
 Cho Young-mu
 Yi Suk-beon
 Yeonguijeong

See also 
 한국연대인물 종합시스템- 하륜 
 하륜 
 대림 아크로 감리

References

 Kim Haboush, JaHyun and Martina Deuchler (1999). Culture and the State in Late Chosŏn Korea.  Cambridge: Harvard University Press. ;  OCLC 40926015
 Lee, Peter H. (1993). Sourcebook of Korean Civilization, Vol.  1. New York: Columbia University Press. ; ; ;  OCLC 26353271
 Noh, Daehwan. "The Eclectic Development of Neo-Confucianism and Statecraft from the 18th to the 19th Century," Korea Journal. Winter 2003.

1348 births
1416 deaths
Neo-Confucian scholars
Korean educators
Historians of Korea
Joseon scholar-officials
15th-century Korean philosophers
14th-century Korean poets
15th-century Korean poets